Ignaz Sonnleithner, from 1828 Ignaz Edler von Sonnleithner (30 July 1770 – 27 November 1831), was an Austrian jurist, writer and educator. He also founded the Society of Music Friends of the Austrian Imperial State in 1812.

Life

Family
Sonnleithner was born on 30 July 1770 in Vienna to Christoph Sonnleithner, a lawyer and composer of church music, symphonies and quartets, and Anna Maria Franziska Sonnleithner Doppler, née Dobler (1739–1810). His brother was Joseph Sonnleithner and his sister Maria Anna Sonnleithner (1767–1819), married to Dr. Wenzel Grillparzer (1760–1809) from 12 January 1789, was the mother of Franz Grillparzer. He was married to Anna Putz (1773–1824) and one of his sons was Leopold von Sonnleithner.

Career
Sonnleithner was an Imperial Council, a solicitor from 1795, a civil law notary since 1803 and in 1801 professor of Trade and Exchange law at the University of Vienna. He also was a writer and founder of the General Pension Institution. He was in Vienna on 20 April 1828 with a nobility diploma dated 14 June 1828 stating that he was raised by the Austrian nobility.

Sonnleithner led from 1815 to 1824 a musical salon, where many songs were premiered by Franz Schubert. His witty sayings were legendary and circulated long after his death in Vienna. Eduard von Bauernfeld writes in his memoirs: "Grillparzer's uncle from maternal side was a famous Viennese wit." He died on 27 November 1831 and was buried in the Matzleinsdorfer cemetery at Wiener Gemeindebezirk 5 (Stadtbezirk). In 1890, the Sonnleithnergasse in Vienna-Favoriten was named after him.

Additional informations

Notes

References

Attribution
This article is based on the translation of the corresponding article on the German Wikipedia. A list of contributors can be found there at the History section.

Sources
 

Genealogical Handbook of nobility, Adelslexikon Vol. III, Vol. 128 the whole series, C. A. Starke publishing, Limburg (Lahn) 2002, 
 Peter Leisching: Die Sonnleithners. In: Magazine Adler. 1995, p. 65f

Bibliography
Trial of a guideline on the Austrian legal action and exchange, Anton Gassler publishing, Vienna 1801
Vienna thoughts on banknotes, bonds and public funds. To reassure his fellow citizens. Andreas Gassler publishing, Vienna 1810
Textbook of commercial science for the use of the students of the Imperial Polytechnic Institute in Vienna, Carl Gerold publishing, Vienna 1819
Textbook on the Austrian trade and exchange law, combined with legal provisions on the common law relationships of the merchants, Vienna 1820 (1st ed.), 1832 (2nd ed.)

External links

Sonnleithner, Ignaz von in Constantin von Wurzbach, Biographisches Lexikon des Kaiserthums Oesterreich, 36. Vol, p. 5, Imperial Court and State printing house, Wien 1878.

1770 births
1831 deaths
Academic staff of the University of Vienna
Austrian male writers
Lawyers from Vienna
Austrian educators
19th-century Austrian writers
19th-century male writers
Edlers of Austria